Edward L. Halbriter  (February 2, 1860 – August 9, 1936) was a Major League Baseball pitcher who played in 1882 with the Philadelphia Athletics.

External links

1860 births
1936 deaths
Major League Baseball pitchers
Baseball players from New York (state)
Philadelphia Athletics (AA) players
19th-century baseball players
Terre Haute (minor league baseball) players